Putative pre-mRNA-splicing factor ATP-dependent RNA helicase DHX32 is an enzyme that in humans is encoded by the DHX32 gene.

DEAD box proteins, characterized by the conserved motif Asp-Glu-Ala-Asp (DEAD), are putative RNA helicases. They are implicated in a number of cellular processes involving alteration of RNA secondary structure such as translation initiation, nuclear and mitochondrial splicing, and ribosome and spliceosome assembly. Based on their distribution patterns, some members of this DEAD box protein family are believed to be involved in embryogenesis, spermatogenesis, and cellular growth and division. This gene encodes a member of this family. The function of this member has not been determined. Alternative splicing of this gene generates two transcript variants, but the full length nature of one of the variants has not been defined.

References

Further reading